William B. Eerdmans Publishing Company is a religious publishing house based in Grand Rapids, Michigan. Founded in 1911 by Dutch American William B. Eerdmans (November 4, 1882 – April 1966) and still independently owned with William's daughter-in-law Anita Eerdmans as president, Eerdmans has long been known for publishing a wide range of Christian and religious books, from academic works in Christian theology, biblical studies, religious history, and reference to popular titles in spirituality, social and cultural criticism, and literature.

William B. Eerdmans
William Eerdmans was born "Wiltje Eerdmans" in Bolsward, the son of Dirkje Pars and the textile manufacturer Bernardus Dirk Eerdmans. He immigrated to the United States in 1902, heading for Grand Rapids, Michigan, a center of 19th-century Dutch immigration and Calvinism. In 1911 with his partner, Brant Sevensma, Eerdmans formed the Eerdmans–Sevensma book dealership, specializing in theological textbooks. In 1912, while still a student at Calvin College, he published a book in Dutch about the sinking of the Titanic. In 1915, Sevensma left, and Eerdmans continued as sole owner of the renamed William B. Eerdmans Publishing Company.

Over his career Eerdmans published books by authors including C. S. Lewis, Karl Barth, Richard J. Neuhaus, Nicholas Wolterstorff, Richard Mouw, Martin Marty, Rowan Williams, Joan Chittister, Dorothy Day, Mark Noll, James Tunstead Burtchaell and many others.

After his death in 1966, he was succeeded by his son, William B. Eerdmans Jr.

Eerdmans Books for Young Readers began in 1995 as an imprint of William B. Eerdmans Publishing Company, specializing in fiction and non-fiction for younger readers, from babies to young adults.

See also
 New International Commentary on the New Testament
 New International Greek Testament Commentary

References

Bibliography

External links
 William B. Eerdmans Publishing Co.
 William B. Eerdmans (1880-1966) at the New Netherland Institute
 100 Years of Eerdmans: A Timeline of Major Events
 Eerdmans Books for Young Readers

Book publishing companies based in Michigan
Christian mass media companies
Christian publishing companies
Companies based in Grand Rapids, Michigan
Religion in Grand Rapids, Michigan
Protestantism in Michigan
Publishing companies established in 1911